Faiz Sucuoğlu (born 27 August 1961) is a Turkish Cypriot politician who was the prime minister of Northern Cyprus from 5 November 2021 to 12 May 2022.

Biography 
Sucuoğlu was born in Polis on 27 August 1961. His father, Mehmet Salih Sucuoğlu (died 2018), later served as the Undersecretary of the Ministry of Settlement in Northern Cyprus. 

After graduating from Lefkoşa Türk Lisesi (Nicosia Turkish High School), he attained a scholarship from the German government to study medicine in that country. He completed his medical education by studying his final two years at the Istanbul University Çapa Faculty of Medicine. He then specialised in obstetrics and gynaecology at the Zeynep Kamil Hospital in Istanbul, and worked there after the completion of his training until 1993, when he returned to Cyprus. He subsequently served in the military and opened his private clinic, where he worked for 20 years.

Career  
He served as the head of the Lefkoşa District section of the National Unity Party between 2011 and 2013. He was elected to parliament, representing Lefkoşa for the UBP, in the 2013 election. He served as the Minister of Tourism in the Kalyoncu cabinet in 2013, and as the Minister of Health in the Özgürgün cabinet in 2016-2017. He was re-elected as an MP in 2018.

He was elected as the leader of the UBP on 31 October 2021, garnering votes of 60.6% of the party members.

Sucuoğlu formed a coalition government with the Democratic Party and became Prime Minister on 5 November 2021.

References 

1961 births
Living people
Prime Ministers of Northern Cyprus
National Unity Party (Northern Cyprus) politicians
People from Paphos District
Istanbul University alumni